The 2015 Bauer Watertechnology Cup was a professional tennis tournament played on carpet courts. It was the 19th edition of the tournament which was part of the 2015 ATP Challenger Tour. It took place in Eckental, Germany between 2 November and 8 November 2015.

Singles main-draw entrants

Seeds

 1 Rankings are as of 26 October 2015.

Other entrants
The following players received wildcards into the singles main draw:
  Maximilian Marterer
  Daniel Masur
  Oscar Otte
  Philipp Petzschner

The following player received entry into the singles main draw with a protected ranking:
  Marco Chiudinelli

The following players received entry from the qualifying draw:
  Niels Desein 
  Márton Fucsovics 
  Yannick Hanfmann
  Ante Pavić

The following player received entry as a lucky loser:
  Jan Hernych

Champions

Singles

 Mikhail Youzhny def.  Benjamin Becker 7–5, 6–3

Doubles

 Ruben Bemelmans /  Philipp Petzschner def.  Ken Skupski /  Neal Skupski 7–5, 6–2

External links
Official Website

Bauer Watertechnology Cup
Challenger Eckental
Bauer Watertechnology cup